Daniel Richard Goddard (born 28 August 1971) is an Australian-American actor and model. He is known for his starring role as Dar on the syndicated action drama BeastMaster, based on the 1982 film The Beastmaster, and for playing Cane Ashby on the CBS daytime soap opera The Young and the Restless from 2007 to 2019.

Career
He had nearly completed a degree in finance, but he transferred to the Ensemble Actors Studio without finishing the degree. After several theatrical appearances, Goddard landed his first television role in the Australian soap opera Home and Away, as Eric Phillips.

Goddard then departed for Hollywood, modelling for Calvin Klein and Dolce & Gabbana. He landed the lead role of Dar on the series BeastMaster from 1999 to 2002, returning to his native country, Australia, to film the series.

In January 2007, he joined the cast of the American soap The Young and the Restless, playing the role of Cane Ashby. Owing to his popularity with the female audience, on occasion Goddard has modeled on another CBS Daytime television series, The Price Is Right. In October 2019, he announced he was leaving The Young and the Restless.

Personal life
Goddard was born in Sydney, New South Wales, Australia. He married Rachael Marcus on 3 February 2002. They have two sons, born February 2006 and December 2008. On 12 June 2020, Goddard became an American citizen.

Filmography

Actor

Writer

==References==

External links
Daniel Goddard Official Twitter
Biography at CBS.com

Australian male soap opera actors
American male soap opera actors
Australian male models
American male models
Models from Sydney
Male actors from Sydney
1971 births
Living people
Australian emigrants to the United States
21st-century American male actors
People with acquired American citizenship